Syd Crossley (18 November 1885 – 1 November 1960) was an English stage and film actor. Born in London in 1885, Crossley began his career as a music hall comedian.  He appeared in more than 110 films, often cast as a butler, between 1925 and 1942, with some of his most memorable early performances in Hal Roach shorts opposite Stan Laurel, Charley Chase, and Mabel Normand. He died in Troon, Cornwall.

Partial filmography

 Dr. Pyckle and Mr. Pryde (1925)
 North Star (1925)
 The Unknown Soldier (1926)
 The Golden Web (1926)
 Jewels of Desire (1927)
 Romantic Rogue (1927)
 Play Safe (1927)
 One Hour Married (1927)
 The Blood Ship (1927)
 The Circus Kid (1928)
 Into No Man's Land (1928)
 Fangs of the Wild (1928)
 A Perfect Gentleman (1928)
 The Hate Ship  (1929)
 Atlantic (1929)
 Atlantik (1929)
 The Younger Generation (1929)
 The Fatal Warning (1929)
 The Middle Watch (1930)
 Just for a Song (1930)
 Never Trouble Trouble (1931)
 The Professional Guest (1931)
 The Flying Fool (1931)
 For the Love of Mike (1932)
 Tonight's the Night (1932)
 The Mayor's Nest (1932)
 Here's George (1932)
 High Society (1932)
 The Umbrella (1933)
 The Bermondsey Kid (1933)
 You Made Me Love You (1933)
 The King's Cup (1933)
 Letting in the Sunshine (1933)
 Over the Garden Wall (1934)
 Give Her a Ring (1934)
 The Night Club Queen (1934)
 Those Were the Days (1934)
 Dandy Dick (1935)
 Jimmy Boy (1935)
 The Deputy Drummer (1935)
 It's a Bet (1935)
 Honeymoon for Three (1935)
 The Man in the Mirror (1936)
 Public Nuisance No. 1 (1936)
 Two's Company (1936)
 Full Speed Ahead (1936)
 Cheer Up (1936)
 The Man Behind the Mask (1936)
 Pay Box Adventure (1936)
 Keep Your Seats, Please (1936)
 The Limping Man (1936)
 Queen of Hearts (1936)
 Old Mother Riley (1937)
 There Was a Young Man (1937)
 Rhythm Racketeer (1937)
 Young and Innocent (1937)
 Feather Your Nest (1937)
 Boys Will Be Girls (1937)
 Penny Paradise (1938)
 Sweet Devil (1938)
 We're Going to Be Rich (1938)
 Save a Little Sunshine (1938)
 Come On George! (1939)
 Meet Maxwell Archer (1940)
 Old Mother Riley's Circus (1941)
 Let the People Sing (1942)

References

External links

1885 births
1960 deaths
English male film actors
English male silent film actors
Male actors from London
20th-century English male actors
British expatriate male actors in the United States